Donald Paterson may refer to:

Donald Paterson (politician)  (1926–1999), Canadian politician
Donald G. Paterson (1892–1961), American psychologist

See also
Don Paterson (born 1963), Scottish poet, writer and musician
Donald Patterson (disambiguation)
Donald Peterson (disambiguation)